is a J-pop group under Johnny & Associates, made up of five members.

History

B.I.Shadow
In 2008 B.I.Shadow was formed as a Johnny's Jr. group. At that time the members were: Kento Nakajima, Fuma Kikuchi, and Misaki Takahata. During that year, they acted in the drama Scrap Teacher. In March 2009, Hokuto Matsumura joined the group during a Hey! Say! 7 concert. On May 27, 2009, Takahata suddenly quit Johnny's, because of his studies. Later in the same year Yugo Kochi joined Johnny's and was put in the group shortly after his audition. On June 4, 2009, it was announced B.I.Shadow would debut with Yuma Nakayama as Yuma Nakayama w/B.I.Shadow.

Nakayama Yuma w/ B.I.Shadow
 They were created on June 3, 2009, and their debut single "Akuma na Koi/NYC" was released on July 15, 2009.
 On June 7, 2009, Yuma Nakayama w/ B.I.Shadow, Ryosuke Yamada and Yuri Chinen of Hey! Say! JUMP united to form NYC Boys to be supporters for the Women's Volleyball World Grand Prix.

Members

Current members
Yuma Nakayama
B.I.Shadow
Kento Nakajima - He was born on March 13, 1994, in Tokyo, Japan. He acted with Fuma Kikuchi and Misaki Takahata in Scrap Teacher and in the Japanese Drama Koishite Akuma with main character and band member Yuma Nakayama.
Kikuchi Fuma - He was born on March 7, 1995, in Tokyo, Japan. He is, along with Kento Nakajima, one of the original B.I.Shadow members. He also played alongside Kento Nakajima and former B.I.Shadow member Misaki Takahata in the Japanese drama Scrap Teacher.
Hokuto Matsumura - He was born June 18, 1995, in Shizuoka Prefecture, Japan. He is the newest member of B.I.Shadow and also the youngest member. His reason for applying to Johnny's was because he was a fan and admirer of NEWS. He is skilled in Karate and has practiced it since his first year of elementary school. He holds a black belt.
Yugo Kochi - He was born March 8, 1994, in Kanagawa Prefecture, Japan. He is also one of the newer members of B.I.Shadow and is the oldest. When first starting out in Johnny's, he was only a Johnny's Junior for one month before becoming a full-time member of B.I.Shadow.

Past members of B.I.Shadow
Misaki Takahata (left Johnny's in 2009)

Singles
 Akuma na Koi/NYC #1 . 1st week sales - 175,788 . Total sales - 275,439 . RIAJ Certification - Platinum

References 

Japanese boy bands
Japanese pop music groups
Johnny & Associates
Musical groups established in 2009
Japanese idol groups
2009 establishments in Japan
Musical groups from Tokyo